USS Gadwall (AM-362) was an Admirable-class minesweeper built for the U.S. Navy during World War II. She was built to clear minefields in offshore waters.

Gadwall was launched 15 July 1943 by Willamette Iron and Steel Works, Portland Oregon; sponsored by Mrs. Charles McNary; and commissioned 23 June 1945.

End-of-war Pacific Theatre activity
Gadwall departed Astoria, Oregon, 11 July 1945 for shakedown training out of San Pedro, Los Angeles, followed by mine warfare exercises and amphibious maneuvers with fleet units off the California bases of Santa Barbara, San Diego, and Newport Beach.

Post-war inactivation and decommissioning
On 7 December 1945 she put to sea from San Diego for inactivation overhaul at New Orleans, Louisiana, until 11 April 1946. She then shifted to Orange, Texas, where she decommissioned 14 June 1946 and was assigned to the Texas Group, Atlantic Reserve Fleet.

She was reclassified MSF-362 on 7 February 1955 and she remained in reserve berthed at Orange, Texas, until struck from the Navy List 1 November 1966. Gadwall was stripped and designated for sale 10 April 1967.

References

External links
 NavSource Online: Mine Warfare Vessel Photo Archive - Gadwall (MSF 362) - ex-AM-362

Admirable-class minesweepers
World War II mine warfare vessels of the United States
Ships built in Portland, Oregon
1943 ships